Parker Dufferin Mitchell (December 21, 1900 – April 2, 1963) was a Canadian politician. He served in the Legislative Assembly of New Brunswick as member of the Progressive Conservative party from 1952 to his death in 1963.

References

1900 births
1963 deaths
20th-century Canadian politicians
Progressive Conservative Party of New Brunswick MLAs
People from Sunbury County, New Brunswick